"To Where You Are" is a song performed by American singer Josh Groban on his 2001 self-titled debut album. It was written by Richard Marx and Linda Thompson and produced by Richard Marx.

Commercial performance
When released as a single in 2002, the song reached "Bubbling Under Hot 100" chart, peaking at #16 in September of that year. It was more successful on the Billboard Hot Adult Contemporary Tracks chart, where it entered the chart in April 2002 and eventually spent two weeks at the top of the chart in August. It remained on this chart for 36 weeks. In November 2008, the song spent a week on the UK Singles Chart at #94.

Appearances in media
In 2001, Groban guest-starred on two episodes of the Fox television drama Ally McBeal. His latter appearance on the show was in the episode "Nine-One-One", where his character's mother had been killed and his father, a minister, had begun doubting the existence of God. Near the conclusion of the episode, Groban performed "To Where You Are" at a church service. Groban had been asked to return to the show after Fox received numerous letters and inquiries about the singer following his appearance in an earlier episode, "The Wedding", during which he had performed the song "You're Still You".

Groban has included "To Where You Are" in many of his concert sets in the years since the song was released, including at the Nobel Peace Prize Concert in Oslo, Norway in late 2002. The song appears on his first two live albums, Josh Groban in Concert and Live at the Greek, as well as on his 2008 greatest hits release, A Collection.

Cover versions
Kristy Starling recorded this song for her debut album. Marx produced this version as well.

Chloë Agnew from Celtic Woman also recorded this song for her album Walking In The Air, alongside Irish composer David Downes.

Other singers have performed "To Where You Are" on various talent-search reality television programs, including American Idol, America's Got Talent, Canadian Idol, The X Factor, Showtime (Croatia) and Pinoy Pop Superstar (Philippines). Former British The X Factor participants who have recorded their own versions of the song include G4, Rhydian and most recently, Daniel Evans. Daniel performed an emotional rendition in the sing-off stages of The X Factor in 2008 and featured on his debut album No Easy Way in 2010. The song also featured in the 2011 Britain's Got Talent final, where it was sung by eventual winner Jai McDowall. The song was also recorded in 2009 by nine-year-old Jackie Evancho, a soon-to-be singing sensation on America's Got Talent. It appears on her first album, Prelude to a Dream, which was  published privately.

Richard Marx also recorded and released a version for his 2010 acoustic album Stories to Tell.

In 2011, the song was recorded by Joe McElderry for his second studio album, Classic.

Also in 2011, the song was recorded by Mark Evans, a West End star currently in Wicked, but this time it was covered in Welsh, becoming 'Tu hwnt i'r sêr'

In 2014, the song was performed by Hugh Jackman and Richard Marx during Richard Marx's "A Night Out with Friends" live sessions

Charts

Weekly charts

Year-end charts

See also
List of Billboard Adult Contemporary number ones of 2002

References

2000s ballads
2002 singles
Josh Groban songs
Songs written by Richard Marx
Songs written by Linda Thompson (actress)
Song recordings produced by David Foster
Pop ballads